Ayagapata (Hindi:अयागपट्ट) or Ayagapatta is a type of votive slab associated with worship in Jainism.

Background 
Numerous such stone tablets discovered during excavations at ancient Jain sites like Kankali Tila near Mathura in India. Some of them date back to 1st century C.E. These slabs are decorated with objects and designs central to Jain worship such as the stupa, dharmacakra and triratna.

A large number of ayagapata (tablet of homage), votive tablets for offerings and the worship of tirthankara, were found at Mathura.

Description 
These stone tablets bear a resemblance to the earlier Shilapatas - stone tablets that were placed under trees to worship Yakshas. However, this was done by indigenous folk communities before Jainism originated suggesting that both have commonalities in rituals. A scholar on Jain art wrote about an Ayagapata discovered around Kankali Tila, "The technical name of such a tablet was Ayagapata meaning homage panel." Kankali Tila tablet of Sodasa and Parsvanatha ayagapata are one of the important Ayagapata.

Gallery

See also 

 Jain art
 Kankali Tila
 Mathura museum

References

Citation

Sources 
  
 
 

Jain art